The Barneyville Historic District is a predominantly residential historic district on Old Providence and Barneyville Roads in northwestern Swansea, Massachusetts.  The area was the site of a successful shipbuilding operation during the early 19th century, and then became a local center for jewelry making.  The district was added to the National Register of Historic Places in 1990.

Description and history
Barneyville is centered on the junction of Old Providence and Barneyville Roads, and extends eastward along Old Providence Road toward the Palmer River.  Although the area was first settled in the 17th century, it only began to grow as a proper village in the mid-18th century, when a bridge was built over the river to what is now Barrington, Rhode Island.  It became known as a shipbuilding center after Jonathan Barney established a shipyard there in the 1770s that saw its greatest success under Barney's son Mason in the 19th century.  The shipyard, which built wooden ships, failed when demand for metal-hulled ships rose in the late 1850s.  One of the former shipyard workers learned to make jewelry, and built a small factory on the shipyard site, which flourished until the 1920s.  Neither the jewelry factory nor the shipyard structures have survived; the site now has a marker.

The oldest surviving building in the district is the c. 1750 house of Jonathan Barney at 166 Old Providence Road. The house includes both Georgian and later Federal period styling, and has a locally rare brick ell. Barney also built the double house at 22-24 Barneyville Road c. 1771-74. Mason Barney's house, at 1 Barneyville Road, was built in the early 19th century, and is a fine Federal period structure with Colonial Revival alterations made in the early 20th century.

Gallery

See also
National Register of Historic Places listings in Bristol County, Massachusetts

References

Historic districts in Bristol County, Massachusetts
Swansea, Massachusetts
National Register of Historic Places in Bristol County, Massachusetts
Historic districts on the National Register of Historic Places in Massachusetts